William Andrews, known as Billy Andrews or Willie Andrews (born 1886) was an Irish international footballer who played professionally in Ireland and England as a right half.

Career
Andrews was born in Kansas City, USA and was raised in Ireland. He played club football in both Ireland and England, for Distillery, Glentoran, Oldham Athletic, Stockport County, Grimsby Town, Belfast United, Darlington, Leadgate Park and Belfast Bohemians.

Andrews also earned three caps for Ireland between 1908 and 1913.

References
NIFG profile

1886 births
Date of death missing
Irish association footballers (before 1923)
Pre-1950 IFA international footballers
Lisburn Distillery F.C. players
Glentoran F.C. players
Oldham Athletic A.F.C. players
Stockport County F.C. players
Grimsby Town F.C. players
Darlington F.C. players
Leadgate Park F.C. players
English Football League players
Soccer players from Kansas City, Missouri
Year of death missing
Association football wing halves